KBFP  (800 kHz) is an AM radio station broadcasting a sports format, simulcasting KHTY 970 AM and is licensed to Bakersfield, California, United States, it serves inland central California. The station is owned by iHeartMedia, Inc. Its studios are located in southwest Bakersfield, and its transmitter is located south of downtown Bakersfield.

In August 2014, KBFP switched from the 24/7 Comedy satellite feed to the "Today's Comedy" feed after the 24/7 Comedy format ceased operations.

On June 13, 2022, KBFP changed their format from comedy to a simulcast of sports-formatted KHTY 970 AM Bakersfield.

800 AM is a Mexican clear-channel frequency. For that reason, KBFP must reduce power at night from 1,000 watts to 440 watts to avoid interfering with Class A XEROK-AM Ciudad Juarez. KBFP uses a directional antenna with a three-tower array.

Previous logos

References

External links
FCC History Cards for KBFP
Comedy 800 KBFP official website

Radio stations established in 1959
BFP (AM)
IHeartMedia radio stations
1959 establishments in California
Sports radio stations in the United States